Givelda is a rural locality in the Bundaberg Region, Queensland, Australia. In the  Givelda had a population of 50 people.

History 
Givelda Provisional School opened circa 1896. On 1 January 1909 it became Givelda State School.

In the  Givelda had a population of 50 people.

Education 
Givelda State School is a government primary (Prep-6) school for boys and girls at 754 Pine Creek Road. In 2018, the school had an enrolment of 13 students with 2 teachers (1 full-time equivalent) and 6 non-teaching staff (2 full-time equivalent).

References 

Bundaberg Region
Localities in Queensland